James Vee (born 3 February 1959) is a Scottish actor, puppeteer and stunt performer. He is best known for playing a number of Doctor Who monsters and aliens including Bannakaffalatta in the 2007 Christmas special Voyage of the Damned, as well as the Graske in the Doctor Who spin-off series The Sarah Jane Adventures. He is also well known as the actor for R2-D2 in Star Wars: The Last Jedi, replacing the late Kenny Baker, who died in August 2016.

Career
Vee started his career as a stunt double/performer for various small actors and extras in films such as Harry Potter and the Philosopher's Stone.

Vee also starred as Cheeky the dwarf in the King's Theatre, Glasgow adaptation of Snow White and the Seven Dwarves.

Vee originally auditioned for R2-D2 in Star Wars: The Force Awakens, although filming clashed with Pan at the time and Vee was not used.  In November 2015, he was cast as R2-D2 in Star Wars: The Last Jedi, succeeding Kenny Baker before his death in August 2016.

Filmography

Films

Television

References

External links
 
 BBC article about his casting
 Oh So Small - Personal Management/Sole Representative 
 Interview with the Daily Record

21st-century Scottish male actors
Actors with dwarfism
Scottish male television actors
Scottish male film actors
Scottish stunt performers
Entertainers with dwarfism
Living people
1959 births